Boundary Park is a football stadium in Oldham, Greater Manchester, England. Its name originates from the fact that it lies at the northwestern extremity of Oldham, with Royton and Chadderton lying immediately north and west respectively.

Boundary Park was originally known as the Athletic Ground when it was opened in 1896 for Oldham's first professional football club, Oldham County F.C.. When County folded in 1899, Pine Villa F.C. took over the ground and changed their name to Oldham Athletic. Oldham Athletic A.F.C. have played their home games here since the stadium was opened.  Oldham RLFC left their traditional home, Watersheddings, in 1997 and moved to Boundary Park, although they briefly moved to Hurst Cross in Ashton-under-Lyne in 2002, where they played until 2009, when the football club decided that they no longer wanted them as tenants.

Overview
The Lookers Stand on the Broadway side was knocked down as part of a proposed redevelopment (see below). Oldham Borough Council confirmed planning approval for the new North Stand in April 2013. This will have capacity for 2,671 spectators, plus a health and fitness suite, supporters' bar and event facilities. The hardcore Oldham fans are usually considered to be in the Chadderton Road End (Chaddy End); a traditional, small, one-tiered stand. Opposite that is the Rochdale Road End, where one third of the stand is given to away supporters, and home fans the rest, except when the opposition has a large away following, when the situation is reversed. In these cases, season ticket holders have to be reallocated. The main stand has existed since the time when the stadium was originally built, and is a small two-tiered structure.  Terracing disused since the conversion to an all-seater can still be seen towards the end of this stand.

Capacity
The stadium currently has an all-seated capacity of 13,512.  It became an all-seater venue during the 1994–95 season – the season after Oldham Athletic's relegation from the top flight of English football.  In the early days, the stadium could hold nearly 50,000 people.  The highest crowd ever recorded at Boundary Park is 47,671, for an FA Cup tie between Oldham and Sheffield Wednesday in 1930.  The highest attendance for a league match was also recorded during the same season against Blackpool, with 45,304 attending for the promotion clash.

"Fantastic in Plastic"

In 1986 the club installed an artificial pitch in order to generate more income for the club and this coincided with the club's upturn in fortunes under manager Joe Royle.  In 1987, the club reached the play-offs and in 1989–90 the club went through what is regarded as one of the club's greatest ever seasons, reaching the League Cup Final and the semi-final of the FA Cup, and the club claimed major upsets in defeating the likes of Arsenal, Southampton, Everton and Aston Villa. Critics felt that the pitch gave the club an advantage, but in 1991 Royle responded to this. When Portsmouth manager Frank Burrows declared that Oldham could not play away from home, Royle stuck the article to the dressing room door and the team responded with a 4–1 victory.  

At the end of the 1990–91 season the club secured promotion to the top flight, the final match on the plastic pitch was probably one of the most memorable games played at the ground when Latics, in order to win the old Second Division, had to beat Sheffield Wednesday and rely on West Ham losing.  After 60 minutes of the game, Sheffield Wednesday were 2–0 up, but Ian Marshall pulled a goal back, then Paul Bernard equalised with less than ten minutes to play.  By this point, West Ham were losing. In time added on, Andy Barlow went down in the box and the referee awarded a penalty.  Neil Redfearn stepped up to convert it and a mass pitch invasion followed, as it had been confirmed that West Ham had lost 2–1 at home to Notts County. In gaining promotion to the top flight, Oldham Athletic were forced to have the plastic pitch removed because of league rules.  They stayed in the top division for three seasons (1991–92, 1992–93 and 1993–94) before being relegated, and after three disappointing seasons in the second tier were relegated again in 1997.  They remained in the third division, which was later called League One, until they were relegated at the end of the 2017–18 season.

Records
Boundary Park is anecdotally known as being the coldest ground in the Football League, earning the nickname coined by Joe Royle, Ice Station Zebra. It is also the second-highest stadium, at 526 feet (155m) above sea level, of any Premier League or Football League club after the Hawthorns, home of West Bromwich Albion, 552 feet (168m).

Redevelopment 

There were plans in the late 1990s for a move to a new 20,000 seater stadium on adjoining waste ground, but these were scrapped.

On 15 February 2006, the club unveiled plans for the redevelopment of their current ground.  The plans would see every stand other than the Rochdale Road End being redeveloped.  When completed it would initially be a 16,000 seater stadium, estimated to cost £80 million, and with a working name of the Oldham Arena.

On 14 November 2007, Oldham Athletic received planning permission for the Broadway Stand, whilst Oldham Borough Council rejected the further development of the stadium due to local objections regarding the height and size of a proposed block of flats.  On 12 December 2007, after amending the plans, another council meeting gave permission for redevelopment.  Facilities would include conferencing and a hotel plus the option of a casino.

Demolition of the Broadway Stand started on 8 May 2008, with the work completed before the start of the new season.  The building of the new stand was due to commence in December 2008 and was expected to take 16 months.

On 5 September 2008, Simon Blitz told podcast World Soccer Daily that although Oldham still planned to continue the development of Boundary Park and surrounding areas, the plans were on hold for now because of the financial crisis of 2007–2010 and the subsequent downturn in the UK property market.

Because of these problems, the club announced in the summer of 2009 that it was considering moving to a new stadium in Failsworth.  This caused some controversy amongst supporters as despite Failsworth being officially part of the borough, it has a Manchester postcode.  It is also only three miles from the City of Manchester Stadium and only one mile from the proposed new stadium of F.C. United of Manchester in Moston, Manchester.  If all went to according to plan, the new stadium was anticipated to be ready for the beginning of the 2011–12 season.

After being led to believe by Oldham Council that the Failsworth site was a deliverable option, the club were extremely disappointed to hear that the Charities Commission had turned down their application.  Oldham Athletic had wasted millions of pounds on drawing up plans, purchasing land and legal fees – and stated that 'confidence in the current council's ability to deliver any proposal for a new stadium is at zero.'

On 28 July 2011 the council offered the club £5.7 million to help with their redevelopment fund of Boundary Park, which would involve the redevelopment of the Broadway Stand.

Oldham Council confirmed planning approval for the new North Stand in April 2013, including a 2,671 capacity stand, a health and fitness suite, supporters' bar and event facilities.  Demolition and preparatory work started in the summer of 2013.

Construction of the new North Stand is still ongoing, although the seating area in the stand was open for use on 17 October 2015 for the home match against Sheffield United.  The new North Stand is significantly taller than the stand that it replaced although the capacity for supporters is roughly the same.  The additional height allows for office space, corporate hospitality, retail opportunities and a gymnasium.

Following the club's relegation to non-league football with the match against Salford City abandoned, Oldham Athletic decided that the Joe Royle 'North' Stand at Boundary Park will be closed for the 2022-23 season, on cost and safety grounds.

References

External links

Boundary Park at PitchMap.co.uk
Boundary Park info from OldhamAthletic.co.uk

Defunct rugby league venues in England
Buildings and structures in Oldham
Oldham Athletic A.F.C.
Sports venues in Greater Manchester
Football venues in England
1904 establishments in England
Sports venues completed in 1904
English Football League venues
Premier League venues
Sport in Oldham